The Mount Carmel Reliance were a minor league baseball team based in Mount Carmel, Pennsylvania. In 1887 and 1888, the Reliance played exclusively as members of the independent Central Pennsylvania League.

History
After playing in the semi–professional Central Pennsylvania league in 1886, the 1887 Mount Carmel "Reliance" team became the first minor league baseball team based in Mount Carmel, Pennsylvania. The 1887 Central Pennsylvania League was accorded protection under the National Agreement, becoming a certified minor league. The Reliance became charter members of the Independent eight–team Central Pennsylvania League, beginning play on June 18, 1887.

In their first season of play, the 1887 Mount Carmel team finished the season in 4th place with a record of 21–21. Playing under manager Charlie Gessner, Mount Carmel ended the season 6.0 games behind the 1st place Shamokin Maroons in the final Central Pennsylvania League standings.

The Mount Carmel Reliance placed 5th in the 1888 Central Pennsylvania League. With the team compiling a record of 11–20, manager Kendrick was replaced by player J. B. Young, who led the Reliance to a 7–11 record. The Reliance ended the season with an overall record of 17–31, playing under managers Kendrick and Young. Mount Carmel finished 12.0 games behind the 1st place Hazelton Pugilists.

Mount Carmel player/manager J.B. Young was a native of Mount Carmel.

The Central Pennsylvania League did not play in the 1889 season. Mount Carmel later hosted teams in the 1908 and 1909 Atlantic League and 1928 Anthracite League, both leagues playing as independent leagues.

The ballpark
The name of the Mount Carmel Reliance home minor league ballpark in 1887 and 1888 is not directly referenced. The Mount Carmel Town Park was in use in the era, having been established in 1853 and is still in use today.

Timeline

Year–by–year records

Notable alumni

John Cullen (1887)
Jim Dee (1888)
Charlie Gessner (1887, MGR)
Charlie McCullough (1888)
Billy Taylor (1887)
George Wetzel (1888)
J. B. Young (1887), (1888, MGR)

See also
Mt. Carmel (minor league baseball) players

References

External links
Mount Carmel - Baseball Reference

Defunct minor league baseball teams
Baseball teams established in 1887
Baseball teams disestablished in 1888
1887 establishments in Pennsylvania
1888 disestablishments in Pennsylvania
Defunct baseball teams in Pennsylvania
Northumberland County, Pennsylvania
Central Pennsylvania League teams